Nikolai Tagantsev (1843–1923) — was a Russian lawyer, legal scholar, and criminologist.

Senator (1887). He was one of the authors of the Russian penal code of 1903. Member of the State Council (1906).

1843 births
1923 deaths
Saint Petersburg State University alumni
Scholars of criminal law
Russian lawyers
Senators of the Russian Empire
Members of the State Council (Russian Empire)
Honorary Members of the Russian Academy of Sciences (1917–1925)